Sindhi may refer to:
something from, or related to Sindh, a province of Pakistan
 Sindhi people, an ethnic group from the Sindh region
 Sindhi language, the Indo-Aryan language spoken by them

People with the name 
 Sarkash Sindhi (1940–2012), poet of Sindhi language
 Ubaidullah Sindhi (1872–1944), political activist
 Ahmad Bakhsh Sindhi (1917–2000), a leader of the Indian National Congress
 Abu Raja Sindhi, Arabic scholar
 Abu Mashar Sindhi, scholar of Hadith literature

See also
 
 Sindh (disambiguation)
 Sindi (disambiguation)
 Sindi people, an ancient Scythian people
 Sinti, a Romani people of Central Europe
 Red Sindhi, a breed of cattle
 Scindia Ghat or Sindhia Ghat, riverside in Varanasi India
 Scindia or Sindhia, former ruling dynasty of Gwalior, India
 Scindian, passenger ship of convicts to Australia
 Shinde, Indian surname

Language and nationality disambiguation pages